James Angel may refer to:
 James Angel (businessman) (1838–1918), Canadian manufacturer of metal products
 Roger Angel (James Roger Prior Angel, born 1941), British-born American astronomer
 James R. Angel (1836–1899), American lawyer
 Jim Angel (1940–2007), Australian radio news presenter
 Jimmie Angel (1899–1956), American aviator

See also
James Angell (disambiguation)